Nuzha Yacoub Al-Ghussein, (1926-2013), was a lifelong political and women's rights activist. She helped establish many of the women's institutions in the West Bank and Jerusalem and organised the first civilian protests against Israeli occupation post the June 1967 war. She was the founder of several orphanages and charity schools and a great advocate for empowering girls particularly from disadvantaged and refugee backgrounds. She also founded the Young Women's Muslim Association, dedicated to the same purpose and was a tireless worker for the support of Palestinian political prisoners. Throughout her life she was a great believer that in the highly fragmented Palestinian political scene there was no limit to what could be achieved if one allowed others to take the credit.

Born in Wadi Hunein and raised in what was reportedly the largest country house in Palestine, Nuzha was introduced to politics early when her father, Yaqub al-Ghusayn,   the first Palestinian leader to be exiled by the British in 1936. She subsequently saw her country house fire bombed by Jewish terrorist organisations during the troubles. She married Anwar Bey Nusseibeh in 1942 who was also involved in politics with her father.

When her husband's second amputation (the result of a wound sustained in the 1948 war) failed and she was told of a British miracle drug available on the black market called penicillin, she drove with her husband's law clerk from Beirut to Jerusalem (147 miles) under heavy shelling in the final stages of the 1948 war, gathered some Persian carpets and silverware from her home (seeing it for the last time) and drove back to Beirut, sold her possessions and bought the penicillin that saved her husband. This same personal courage was demonstrated when she organised one of the first nationalist Palestinian demonstrations against King Hussain's administration after Sharon's raid on Samou village in 1966. In the meantime, along with Hind Husseini and Amal Sahhar she helped establish several orphanages and charity schools for refugee girls as well as campaigning for women's rights and creating women's institutes.

After the fall of Jerusalem in 1967 she organised the first civilian protest against Israeli occupation, made up entirely of women, which was then followed by several protest sit-ins and hunger strikes  that attracted media attention to the Palestinian plight. She also organised the erection of monuments to mark the graves of fallen Arab soldiers in that conflict, against direct military orders to the contrary. These grave markers were subsequently removed by the Israeli military and she increasingly became the target of the attention of the Israeli security who often picked her up for questioning in the early hours of the morning.

Nonetheless, she worked tirelessly to support Palestinian political prisoners, organising the delivery of food an clothing parcels to them and helping rehabilitate them once released from Israeli military prisons. By the mid 1970s she had moved on to rehabilitating Palestinian common criminals by channelling their energies towards political activism, thus launching the first Palestinian acting troupe that staged the first Palestinian political play in the YMCA theatre in Jerusalem in the midst of the 1976 troubles to much Palestinian acclaim, but which was shut down by the Israeli censors after one night. With advancing age she dedicated herself increasingly to her women's organisations and charities, notably the YWMA which she established in 1975. 
A lifelong left-leaning populist she combined charity work with economic empowerment as a means of political liberation for the poor, particularly women. Despite the fact that her marriage was an arranged one and that she occupied the opposite political spectrum to her husband, they formed an effective political couple in occupied Jerusalem. She is survived by her children: Munira; Saida; Zaki; Sari; Hatem and Saker. Her funeral on 22 December 2013 in the Noble Sanctuary in Jerusalem was reported to be the largest funeral Jerusalem had seen since that of her husband who died in 1986. She was made a Knight of Jerusalem in 2010 in recognition of her lifelong dedication to Jerusalem.

References

1926 births
2013 deaths
Palestinian nationalists
Palestinian women's rights activists